Milesina may refer to:
 Milesina (fungus), a genus of fungi in the family Pucciniastraceae
 , a genus of foraminifers in the family